Lysidine may refer to either of two unrelated chemical compounds:

 Lysidine (nucleoside) (C15H25N5O6), a nucleoside
 Lysidine (chemical) (C4H8N2), an imidazoline